Geoffrey Kelsall Peto (8 September 1878 – 8 January 1956) was a British Conservative Party politician and Member of Parliament (MP). In business, he became a director of the industrial firm Morgan Crucible Company.

At the 1923 general election, he stood unsuccessfully in the Louth constituency in Lincolnshire. The following year, in the 1924 general election, he was elected Member of Parliament for Frome in Somerset, but lost the seat in the general election of 1929.

Peto was returned to the House of Commons at the 1931 general election for the Bilston constituency in Wolverhampton and retired from Parliament at the 1935 election. During this period, he acted as Parliamentary Private Secretary to Walter Runciman, the President of the Board of Trade.

In 1938, Peto served as a member of the  Runciman Mission to Czechoslovakia.

He was married to Pauline and they had one child.
Charles Tennyson (civil servant) dedicated a book to him and their long friendship.

References

External links 
 

1878 births
1956 deaths
People educated at Summer Fields School
People from Bilston
Conservative Party (UK) MPs for English constituencies
UK MPs 1924–1929
UK MPs 1931–1935